Halteriphorus is a genus of flies in the family Dolichopodidae. It is known from New Zealand, and contains only one species, Halteriphorus mirabilis.

References

Dolichopodidae genera
Neurigoninae
Diptera of New Zealand
Monotypic Diptera genera
Endemic insects of New Zealand
Taxa named by Octave Parent